Khaled Kehiha (born 12 March 1986 in Istres, France) is a French-Algerian footballer. He currently plays as a defender for FC Istres in the French Ligue 2.

Personal
Khaled's older brother Amor Kehiha is also a professional footballer and is currently playing for FC Istres as well.

External links
Istres profile

1986 births
Living people
French footballers
Association football midfielders
FC Istres players
Algerian footballers
French sportspeople of Algerian descent
Ligue 2 players
FCA Calvi players
UA Cognac players